The United States Department of Justice Criminal Division is a federal agency of the United States Department of Justice that develops, enforces, and supervises the application of all federal criminal laws in the United States. Criminal Division attorneys prosecute many nationally significant cases and formulate and implement criminal enforcement policy. Division attorneys also provide advice and guidance to the Attorney General of the United States, the United States Congress, and the White House on matters of criminal law. The Division was founded in 1919.

Leadership
The Criminal Division is headed by an Assistant Attorney General, appointed by the President of the United States with the advice and consent of the Senate.  Kenneth Polite was appointed by President Joe Biden and sworn in as Assistant Attorney General on July 21, 2021. Nicholas McQuaid was appointed Principal Deputy Assistant Attorney General on January 20, 2021, and served as Acting Assistant Attorney General until Polite's confirmation.

Organization
The Criminal Division is headed by an Assistant Attorney General, who is a political appointee. The Assistant Attorney General is assisted by six Deputy Assistant Attorneys General, who are career attorneys, who each oversee two or more of the Criminal Division's 16 sections.

 Deputy Assistant Attorney General

 Public Integrity Section created after Watergate in 1976
 Office of Enforcement Operations
 Deputy Assistant Attorney General
 Money Laundering and Asset Recovery Section (MLARS)
 Narcotic and Dangerous Drug Section
 Deputy Assistant Attorney General
 Office of International Affairs
 International Criminal Investigative Training Assistance Program formed in 1990
 Office of Overseas Prosecutorial Development Assistance and Training 
 Deputy Assistant Attorney General
 Fraud Section established in 1955
 Appellate Section
 Deputy Assistant Attorney General
 Computer Crime and Intellectual Property Section formed in 1996
 Child Exploitation and Obscenity Section (CEOS). Created in 1987, the section comprises approximately 15 attorneys who prosecute defendants who have violated federal child exploitation and obscenity laws and also assist the 93 United States Attorney Offices in investigations, trials, and appeals related to these offenses. The section also has a number of Computer Forensic Specialist (CFS) within the High Technology Investigative Unit (HTIU) and, under the direction of a section manager, they conduct analysis of Internet technologies used to distribute obscene materials and child pornography.
 Deputy Assistant Attorney General
 Capital Case Section
 Human Rights and Special Prosecutions Section
 Organized Crime and Gang Section
 Principal Deputy Assistant Attorney General
 Chief of Staff and Counselor to the Assistant Attorney General
 Office of Administration
 Office of Policy and Legislation

The Division does not supervise the 94 U.S. Attorney's Offices.

Reorganization
The Criminal Division's Counterterrorism and Counterespionage Sections were transferred to the newly created United States Department of Justice National Security Division in 2006.

See also 
 National Child Victim Identification Program
 Obscenity Prosecution Task Force
 Operation Protect Our Children

References

External links
 
 Detailed description of each of the 16 sections (17 September 2019)

Criminal Division